The 1903–04 Welsh Amateur Cup was the fourteenth season of the Welsh Amateur Cup. The cup was won by Wrexham Victoria who defeated Druids Reserves 4-2 in the final, at Oswestry.

First round

Second round

Third round

Fourth round

Semi-final

Final

References

1903-04
Welsh Cup
1903–04 domestic association football cups